Antechiniscus is a genus of tardigrade in the family Echiniscidae. The genus was first described by Reinhardt Kristensen in 1987.

Species
The genus includes six species:
 Antechiniscus conversus (Horning & Schuster, 1983)
 Antechiniscus jermani Rossi & Claps, 1989
 Antechiniscus lateromamillatus (Ramazzotti, 1964)
 Antechiniscus moscali Claxton, 2001
 Antechiniscus parvisentus (Horning & Schuster, 1983)
 Antechiniscus perplexus (Horning & Schuster, 1983)

References

Further reading
 Kristensen, 1987 : Generic revision of the Echiniscidae (Heterotardigrada), with a discussion of the origin of the family. Collana U.Z.I. Selected Symposia and Monographs, no. 1, p. 261-335.
 Nomenclator Zoologicus info

Echiniscidae
Tardigrade genera